Andrew Payne (born 15 August 1977) is a Barbadian judoka. He competed at the 1996 Summer Olympics and the 2000 Summer Olympics.

References

External links
 

1977 births
Living people
Barbadian male judoka
Olympic judoka of Barbados
Judoka at the 1996 Summer Olympics
Judoka at the 2000 Summer Olympics
Place of birth missing (living people)